William Fellows Englebright (November 23, 1855 – February 10, 1915) was a U.S. Representative from California and father of Representative Harry Lane Englebright.

Born in New Bedford, Massachusetts, Englebright moved with his parents to Vallejo, California. He attended private and public schools and first began serving the United States as a joiner's apprentice at Mare Island Naval Shipyard. After he completed his studies in engineering he established himself in Nevada City, California as a mining engineer where he also served as a member of the Nevada City Board of Education.

Biography 
Englebright was elected as a Republican to the Fifty-ninth Congress to fill the vacancy caused by the resignation of James N. Gillett. In Congress he served on the House Irrigation of Arid Lands committee, the House Mines and Mining committee, and the House Naval Affairs committee.

He was reelected to the Sixtieth and Sixty-first Congresses and served from November 6, 1906, until his defeat in the 1910 election, leaving office on March 3, 1911. After his political career, he resumed his occupation as a mining engineer. Englebright died in Oakland, California on February 10, 1915, and was interred at Pine Grove Cemetery in Nevada City, California.

References

1855 births
1915 deaths
Politicians from New Bedford, Massachusetts
American mining engineers
United States Navy civilians
Republican Party members of the United States House of Representatives from California
19th-century American politicians
Politicians from Vallejo, California
Engineers from California